Marco Ramstein (born 22 November 1978) is a Swiss curler and Olympic medalist. He received a bronze medal at the 2002 Winter Olympics in Salt Lake City.

He played for the Swiss team that received a silver medal at the 2001 world championships.

Teammates 
2002 Salt Lake City Olympic Games

Andreas Schwaller, Skip

Christof Schwaller, Third

Markus Eggler, Second

Damian Grichting, Lead

References

External links
 

1978 births
Living people
Olympic curlers of Switzerland
Curlers at the 2002 Winter Olympics
Olympic bronze medalists for Switzerland
Swiss male curlers
Olympic medalists in curling
Medalists at the 2002 Winter Olympics
Swiss curling champions
21st-century Swiss people